The following is a list of Australian radio station callsigns beginning with the number 5, indicating radio stations in the state of South Australia.

Despite having a callsign allocated to the Northern Territory, commercial station 8SAT is based in South Australia and most of its transmitters are located in the state.

Notes

Defunct Callsigns

 
Radio station callsigns, South Australia
Radio
Lists of radio stations in Australia